The Argentina women's national under-23 volleyball team represents Argentina in women's under-23 volleyball events, it is controlled and managed by the Argentinian Volleyball federation that is a member of South American volleyball body Confederación Sudamericana de Voleibol (CSV) and the international volleyball body government the Fédération Internationale de Volleyball (FIVB).

Results

FIVB U23 World Championship
 Champions   Runners up   Third place   Fourth place

South America U22 Championship
 Champions   Runners up   Third place   Fourth place

U23 Pan American Cup
 Champions   Runners up   Third place   Fourth place

Team

Current squad
The following is the Argentine roster in the 2017 FIVB Women's U23 World Championship.

Head coach: Martín López

Notable players

References

External links
www.feva.org.ar 

Volleyball
National women's under-23 volleyball teams
Volleyball in Argentina